Major-General Beauchamp John Colclough Doran, CB (24 September 1860 – 23 November 1943) was a British Army officer who commanded the 25th Division during the First World War. Commissioned in 1880, Doran saw service on the staff and with the Royal Irish Regiment through a number of colonial campaigns in the late nineteenth century, culminating in command of a mobile column in the Boer War, where he was seriously wounded. He then commanded a battalion of his regiment, followed by a brigade in the British Expeditionary Force. His brigade was mobilised in 1914, and he saw service during the first months of the First World War before being dismissed in October. He was later reinstated as commander of a brigade in the New Armies, and promoted to the 25th Division before it was sent to France in 1915; he led it on the Western Front until June 1916, when he was relieved and sent home. From 1916 to 1918 he commanded the Army forces in southern Ireland, and then held an administrative post in France before retiring in 1920.

Early career

The eldest son of General Sir John Doran and Georgina Magrath, Beauchamp Doran joined the 16th Regiment of Foot in January 1880, transferring to the 18th Foot (shortly to become the Royal Irish Regiment) in February. He served with the 1st Battalion in the Second Anglo-Afghan War that same year, and was promoted to lieutenant on 1 July 1881. He later participated in the 1884-85 Nile Expedition, where he was mentioned in despatches and given a brevet promotion to major, in the Hazara Expedition of 1888, and in the Miranzai Expedition of 1891, where he acted as brigade major. In November 1891 he was appointed to a staff position overseeing musketry standards in the Bengal Army, transferring to the Punjab to take up the same post in 1895. In 1897, he was mentioned in despatches for his service in staff duties with the Kohat-Kurram expedition, and again in 1898 for his work as deputy assistant adjutant-general in the Tirah Expedition, both on the North-West Frontier of India. The following year he was back in Sudan, where he was in charge of the 9th Sudanese Battalion during operations leading to the defeat of the Khalifa in the Battle of Umm Diwaykarat in November 1899 (mentioned in despatches 25 November 1899).

During the Second Boer War he was first posted on staff duties, as a press censor, and then made a brigade major. He commanded the garrison at Rustenburg in early 1900, and later oversaw the remount depot at Cape Town. He first saw field service in May 1901, when he was given command of a mounted column; that November, he was severely wounded and had a horse killed under him, but continued with the column until the end of the war. For his services during the war, he received a brevet promotion to lieutenant-colonel on 29 November 1900, was twice mentioned in despatches, and was appointed a Companion of the Order of the Bath (CB). Following the end of the war in June 1902, he returned to the United Kingdom in the SS Dunottar Castle, which arrived at Southampton in July 1902.

Senior command

On his return, he married Mary MacGeough Bond, a widow; the couple would be married for thirty years before Mary's death, but with no children. In 1904, he was posted to command his battalion, the 1st Royal Irish Regiment, with a brevet promotion to colonel in 1905. He moved to staff duties in 1908, as assistant adjutant-general of Southern Command and then assistant quartermaster-general of Irish Command, but returned to a field position in 1912, when he was appointed to command 8th Infantry Brigade, a regular unit on home service.

Doran was in command of the 8th Brigade when the First World War broke out in August 1914, and the British Expeditionary Force was mobilised for service. His younger brother, Walter Robert Butler Doran, also commanded a brigade of the Expeditionary Force; 17th Infantry Brigade in the 6th Division. He took the brigade to France and commanded it through the Retreat from Mons, the Battle of the Marne and the First Battle of the Aisne. On 20 October, one of his battalions – the 2nd Royal Irish Regiment – was surrounded during the Battle of La Bassée and effectively destroyed for lack of support; on 23 October, he was relieved of command of 8th Brigade and sent home.

The following month, Doran was assigned to command the 68th Brigade, a group of volunteer New Army battalions in 23rd Division. He was promoted to major-general in February 1915, and in May was given command of the 25th Division, another New Army formation completing its training in England. He took it to France that September, where it moved into a quiet sector of the line in late 1915. It remained in quiet sectors until May 1916, when it was moved south to Vimy Ridge, and was involved in defending against a German attack. Doran was relieved of command the following month, and transferred to home service as the commander of the Southern District in Ireland. In 1919 he was appointed to command No. 5 Area in France as part of the demobilisation of the Army, and retired in 1920. Through the War, he had been mentioned in despatches four times.

Retirement

In retirement, Doran was appointed the High Sheriff for the county of Wexford, serving from 1920 to 1921, and as a Deputy Lieutenant for the same county. He lived in Wexford through his retirement, at Ely House; during the unrest leading up to the outbreak of the Irish Civil War, in May 1922, he was arrested and beaten by men rumoured to represent the Provisional Government. After Mary's death in 1932, he remarried an American, Florence Fairchild. He died in 1943, aged 83.

Notes

References

"DORAN, Major-General Beauchamp John Colclough". (2007). In Who Was Who. Online edition
 Obituary in The Times, 26 November 1943, p. 7

External links
 

 

1860 births
1943 deaths
British Army major generals
British Army generals of World War I
Companions of the Order of the Bath
Royal Irish Regiment (1684–1922) officers
British military personnel of the Second Anglo-Afghan War
British Army personnel of the Mahdist War
British Army personnel of the Second Boer War
Deputy Lieutenants of Wexford
British military personnel of the Hazara Expedition of 1888
High Sheriffs of Wexford